Osseghem (French) or Ossegem (Dutch) is a Brussels Metro station on lines 2 and 6. It opened on 6 October 1982 and is named after the Osseghem neighbourhood in the municipality of Molenbeek-Saint-Jean, Belgium. The name is of Germanic origin and is composed of Odso + -inga + gem, meaning "residence of the people of Odso".

External links

Brussels metro stations
Railway stations opened in 1982
Molenbeek-Saint-Jean
1982 establishments in Belgium